Mateo Míguez Adán (born 11 May 1987 in Redondela, Galicia), known simply as Mateo, is a Spanish footballer who plays for Coruxo FC as an attacking midfielder.

Career statistics

Club

References

External links

Celta de Vigo biography 

1987 births
Living people
Spanish footballers
Footballers from Redondela
Association football midfielders
Segunda División players
Segunda División B players
Segunda Federación players
Celta de Vigo B players
RC Celta de Vigo players
SD Ponferradina players
CD Guadalajara (Spain) footballers
Coruxo FC players
Veikkausliiga players
Ykkönen players
PK-35 Vantaa (men) players
Spanish expatriate footballers
Expatriate footballers in Finland
Spanish expatriate sportspeople in Finland